Madeline Jane "Maya" DiRado - Andrews (born April 5, 1993) is a retired American competitive swimmer who specialized in freestyle, butterfly, backstroke, and individual medley events.  She attended and swam for Stanford University, where she won NCAA titles in the 200 and 400 meter individual medley in 2014 and graduated with a degree in management science and engineering. At the 2016 US Olympic Trials, DiRado qualified to swim the 200 meter and 400 meter individual medley events, as well as the 200 meter backstroke, at the 2016 Summer Olympics. At the 2016 Summer Olympics in Rio de Janeiro, she won a gold medal in the women's 4x200 meter freestyle relay, a silver medal in the 400 meter individual medley, a bronze medal in the women's 200 meter individual medley, and a gold medal in the 200 meter backstroke. Following the Olympics, DiRado retired from the sport.

Early years
DiRado is the daughter of Marit (née Parker) and Ruben DiRado. Her father is from Argentina, his parents having emigrated from Italy to Argentina after World War II. She received her short name Maya from her sister who could not pronounce Madeline.

DiRado began swimming at the age of six, when she joined the Santa Rosa Neptunes with her Olympic Teammate Molly Hannis. At the age of 17, DiRado graduated from Maria Carrillo High School in Santa Rosa, where she was a three-time high school state champion in the 200 yard IM. In her senior year in 2010, she set the California state record with a  time of 1:56.17 in the 200 yard I.M. She also won the 100 yard freestyle with a time of 49.83.

College career
As part of a long line of Stanford graduates, DiRado followed in her family's footsteps and attended Stanford University. In her freshman year, she finished second in the 200 yard IM (individual medley) with a time of 1:54.66 and third in the 400 yard IM (4:01.02) at the Division 1 NCAA Championships. The following year, she finished third and fourth in the 200 yard and 400 yard IM events, as well as second in the 200 yard backstroke to future Olympic teammate Elizabeth Beisel, with a time of 1:51.42. She set the age group record for female swimmers age 17–18 as she became the fifth woman ever to swim under four minutes in the 400 IM (3:59.88). In the 2013 NCAA Division 1 Championships, DiRado touched third and second in the 200 and 400 yard IM and fifth in 200 yard backstroke. She concluded her Stanford career with her first individual titles in both the 200 and 400 yard IM, and added a second-place finish in the 200 yard butterfly. For her performance in her senior year, she was named Pac-12 Swimmer of the Year.

Career list of All-American Titles: 
200 back: 2011 (5th), 2012 (2nd);
200 IM: 2011 (2nd), 2012 (3rd); 
400 IM: 2011 (3rd), 2012 (4th); 
400 Free Relay: 2011 (5th);
800 Free Relay:  2011 (9th), 2012 (7th).

Swimming career

2012 Olympic Trials
At the 2012 United States Olympic Trials, the U.S. qualifying meet for the Olympics, DiRado swam the 200 meter IM, 400 meter IM, and 200 meter back. She finished 4th in both IM events, which did not qualify her for the Olympics since only the top two finishers of each event qualified.

2013 World Championships

DiRado qualified for the 2013 World Aquatics Championships held in Barcelona in three events: 400 meter IM, 200 meter butterfly, and the 4x200 meter freestyle relay. She earned her spot by winning the 400 meter IM, gaining silver in the 200 meter butterfly, and touching fifth in the 200 meter freestyle at the 2013 Phillips 66 National Championships.

She swam the preliminary heat of the 4x200 meter freestyle relay with Chelsea Chenault, Karlee Bispo, and Jordan Mattern. The finals team of Katie Ledecky, Shannon Vreeland, Karlee Bispo, and Missy Franklin won the 4x200 meter freestyle relay in the evening, so DiRado was awarded a gold medal for her prelim contributions. She also finished fourth in the 400 meter IM and twelfth in the 200 meter fly.

2014 Pan Pacific Swimming Championships

DiRado won two medals at the Pan Pacific Swimming Championships in 2014 – a gold in the 200 meter IM and a silver in the 400 meter IM. In the 200 meter IM, she beat Australian swimmer Alicia Coutts 2:09.93 to 2:10.25 for gold, which tied the meet record Emily Seebohm set in 2010. She finished second in the 400 meter IM in 4:35.37, compared to 4:31.99 swam by her teammate and winner Elizabeth Beisel. DiRado also finished ninth in the 200 meter butterfly.

2015 World Championships

DiRado swam two events at the 2015 World Championships, the two individual medleys. In her first event, the 200 meter IM, DiRado just finished outside of a medal, touching fourth with a time of 2:08.99. However, she won her first individual World Championship medal in the 400 meter IM, in which she finished second in 4:31.71 behind Katinka Hosszú.

2016 Summer Olympics

At the 2016 United States Olympic Trials, the U.S. qualifying meet for the Rio Olympics, DiRado qualified for the U.S. Olympic team for the first time by winning the 200-meter individual medley, 400-meter individual medley, and 200-meter backstroke.

At the 2016 Olympic Games in Rio de Janeiro, Brazil, DiRado won four medals – two gold, one silver, and one bronze. On the first night of competition, DiRado touched second in the 400-meter individual medley in 4:31.15 behind Katinka Hosszú, who broke the world record. She also won a bronze medal in the 200-meter individual medley in a personal best time of 2:08.79, behind Hosszú and Siobhan-Marie O'Connor who won gold and silver respectively. Even though she did not swim the 200-meter freestyle at Trials, DiRado was placed in the finals relay lineup for the 4×200-meter freestyle relay by the coaches. Along with Allison Schmitt, Leah Smith, and Katie Ledecky, DiRado won her first gold medal of the Olympics. In her final event, the 200-meter backstroke, DiRado again faced Hosszú, who was favored to win the event. Hosszú led for the entire race until DiRado surged in the last 25 meters and out touched Hosszú by 6 one-hundredths, 2:05.99 to 2:06.05, for the win.

2016–2021: Retirement and redirection
DiRado retired from the competitive swimming side of the sport following her performances in August 2016 at her Olympic debut in the 2016 Summer Olympics. She decided to stay active in the swimming community after her retirement by serving as a board member for the United States Swimming Foundation and USA Swimming.

In 2020, DiRado spoke to the leadership council at the University of Minnesota about what it means to be a good team player and leader in swimming through actions such as honoring one's values. She was still retired from competitive swimming as of August 2021.

Personal life
DiRado married former Stanford swimmer Rob Andrews on September 19, 2015 at First Presbyterian Church in Santa Rosa, California. The two met while they were both on the Stanford swim team. In August 2021, DiRado announced she and her husband were pregnant and expecting a boy. An article on the announcement published by SwimSwam was the 19th most read article out of all articles published on SwimSwam for the 2021 year. In January 2022, DiRado announced the birth of her and her husband's son, whom they named Charlie Alan Andrews.

In March 2017, she joined the management consulting firm McKinsey & Company as a Business Analyst. While at McKinsey & Company, DiRado supported strategic health care provider procurement improvements and implemented risk identification programs in the banking industry. As of May 2018, she was an Associate at the grantmaking organization King Philanthropies. DiRado graduated from Stanford with a Bachelor of Science in Management Science and Engineering.

Personal best times

References

External links 
 
 
 
 
 
 

1993 births
Living people
American female butterfly swimmers
American female freestyle swimmers
American female medley swimmers
American people of Argentine descent
American people of Italian descent
McKinsey & Company people
Medalists at the 2016 Summer Olympics
Olympic gold medalists for the United States in swimming
Olympic silver medalists for the United States in swimming
Olympic bronze medalists for the United States in swimming
Swimmers from San Francisco
Stanford Cardinal women's swimmers
Swimmers at the 2016 Summer Olympics
World Aquatics Championships medalists in swimming
Universiade medalists in swimming
Universiade gold medalists for the United States